Stearman Aircraft Corporation was an aircraft manufacturer in Wichita, Kansas. Although the company designed a range of other aircraft, it is most known for producing the Model 75, which is commonly known simply as the "Stearman" or "Boeing Stearman".

History
Lloyd Stearman established the Stearman Aircraft Corporation in 1927. Initially, the company was founded as Stearman Aircraft Corporation in October 1926 at Venice, California, where four C1 and C2 biplanes were built before production halted for financial reasons. On 27 September 1927, a new Stearman Aircraft Corporation was founded. The factory was then established in Wichita, Kansas, with financing of Walter Innes, where the new model Stearman C3 and Stearman 4 Speedmail were constructed. Two years later, he sold it to the United Aircraft and Transport Corporation. The Northrop Aircraft Corporation was merged into Stearman in July 1931.

In September 1934, antitrust legislation forced United to separate its airline and aircraft manufacturing operations. At this time, Boeing, which had been part of United Aircraft and Transport Corporation, became a separate business once again, and Stearman was made a subsidiary of it. About the same time the Stearman plant created its most successful and enduring product, the Model 75 Kaydet. The Kaydet became the primary trainer aircraft for the United States military during World War II. Stearman operated as a division until September 1941, when it became the Wichita Division, Boeing Airplane Company.

In 2005, Boeing sold the civil portion of the former Stearman operations to Onex, forming Spirit AeroSystems, although it retained the military operations.

Aircraft

References

Footnotes

Notes

Bibliography

 Boeing Company. Pedigree of Champions: Boeing Since 1916, Third Edition. Seattle, WA: The Boeing Company, 1969. 
 Bowers, Peter M. Boeing aircraft since 1916. London: Putnam Aeronautical Books, 1989. .
 Simpson, Rod. Airlife's World Aircraft. London: Airlife Publishing Ltd. 2001. .

External links

Defunct aircraft manufacturers of the United States
Boeing mergers and acquisitions
1929 mergers and acquisitions
 
1927 establishments in Kansas
1941 disestablishments in Kansas